In underwater diving activities such as saturation diving, technical diving and nitrox diving, the maximum operating depth (MOD) of a breathing gas is the depth below which the partial pressure of oxygen (pO2) of the gas mix exceeds an acceptable limit. This limit is based on risk of central nervous system oxygen toxicity, and is somewhat arbitrary, and varies depending on the diver training agency or Code of Practice, the level of underwater exertion expected and the planned duration of the dive, but is normally in the range of 1.2 to 1.6 bar.

The MOD is significant when planning dives using gases such as heliox, nitrox and trimix because the proportion of oxygen in the mix determines a maximum depth for breathing that gas at an acceptable risk. There is a risk of acute oxygen toxicity if the MOD is exceeded. The tables below show MODs for a selection of oxygen mixes. Atmospheric air contains approximately 21% oxygen, and has an MOD calculated by the same method.

Safe limit of partial pressure of oxygen
Acute, or central nervous system oxygen toxicity is a time variable response to the partial pressure exposure history of the diver and is both complex and not fully understood.

Central nervous system oxygen toxicity manifests as symptoms such as visual changes (especially tunnel vision), ringing in the ears (tinnitus), nausea, twitching (especially of the face), behavioural changes (irritability, anxiety, confusion), and dizziness. This may be followed by a tonic–clonic seizure consisting of two phases: intense muscle contraction occurs for several seconds (tonic phase); followed by rapid spasms of alternate muscle relaxation and contraction producing convulsive jerking (clonic phase). The seizure ends with a period of unconsciousness (the postictal state). The onset of seizure depends upon the partial pressure of oxygen in the breathing gas and exposure duration. However, exposure time before onset is unpredictable, as tests have shown a wide variation, both amongst individuals, and in the same individual from day to day. In addition, many external factors, such as underwater immersion, exposure to cold, and exercise will decrease the time to onset of central nervous system symptoms. Decrease of tolerance is closely linked to retention of carbon dioxide. Other factors, such as darkness and caffeine, increase tolerance in test animals, but these effects have not been proven in humans.

The maximum single exposure limits recommended in the NOAA Diving Manual are 45 minutes at 1.6 bar, 120 minutes at 1.5 bar, 150 minutes at 1.4 bar, 180 minutes at 1.3 bar and 210 minutes at 1.2 bar.

Formula
The formula simply divides the absolute partial pressure of oxygen which can be tolerated (expressed in atm or bar) by the fraction of oxygen in the breathing gas, to calculate the absolute pressure at which the mix can be breathed. (for example, 50% nitrox can be breathed at twice the pressure of 100% oxygen, so divide by 0.5, etc.). Of this total pressure which can be tolerated by the diver, 1 atmosphere is due to surface pressure of the Earth's air, and the rest is due to the depth in water. So the 1 atmosphere or bar contributed by the air is subtracted to give the pressure due to the depth of water. The pressure produced by depth in water, is converted to pressure in feet sea water (fsw) or metres sea water (msw) by multiplying with the appropriate conversion factor, 33 fsw per atm, or 10 msw per bar. 

In feet

In which pO2 is the chosen maximum partial pressure of oxygen in atmospheres absolute and the FO2 is the fraction of oxygen in the mixture. For example, if a gas contains 36% oxygen (FO2 = 0.36) and the limiting maximum pO2 is chosen at 1.4 atmospheres absolute, the MOD in feet of seawater (fsw)  is 33 fsw/atm x [(1.4 ata / 0.36) − 1] = 95.3 fsw.

In metres

In which pO2 is the chosen maximum partial pressure in oxygen in bar and the FO2 is the fraction of oxygen in the mixture. For example, if a gas contains 36% oxygen and the maximum pO2 is 1.4 bar, the MOD (msw) is 10 msw/bar x [(1.4 bar / 0.36) − 1] = 28.9 msw.

Tables 

These depths are rounded to the nearest foot.

These depths are rounded to the nearest metre.

See also

Notes

References

Sources 

 

 

 

 

Dive planning
Underwater diving safety
Breathing gases